Tumbler Ridge Airport  is located  south of Tumbler Ridge, British Columbia, Canada.

References

Registered aerodromes in British Columbia
Peace River Regional District